Duško Bunić (born December 4, 1989) is a Serbian professional basketball player. He is a 2.07 center who last played for KK Krka.

International career 
Bunić was member of the team that represented Serbia at the 2011 Summer Universiade in Shenzhen, finishing as the gold medal winners.

References

External links
 Duško Bunić at aba-liga.com
 Duško Bunić at eurobasket.com
 Duško Bunić at fiba.com

1989 births
Living people
ABA League players
Basketball League of Serbia players
Centers (basketball)
KK Budućnost players
KK Igokea players
KK Krka players
KK Novi Sad players
KK Metalac Valjevo players
KK MZT Skopje players
KK Vojvodina Srbijagas players
KK Spartak Subotica players
People from Bihać
Serbian men's basketball players
Serbian expatriate basketball people in North Macedonia
Serbian expatriate basketball people in Montenegro
Serbian expatriate basketball people in Slovenia
Serbs of Bosnia and Herzegovina
Universiade medalists in basketball
Universiade gold medalists for Serbia
Medalists at the 2011 Summer Universiade